Joseph Anthony Campanella (November 21, 1924 – May 16, 2018) was an American character actor. He appeared in more than 200 television and film roles from the early 1950s to 2009. Campanella was best remembered for his roles as Joe Turino on Guiding Light from 1959 to 1962, Lew Wickersham on the detective series Mannix from 1967 to 1968, Brian Darrell on the legal drama The Bold Ones: The Lawyers from 1969 to 1972, Harper Deveraux on the soap opera Days of Our Lives from 1987 to 1992, Science International from 1976 to 1979, and his recurring role as Jonathan Young on The Bold and the Beautiful from 1996 to 2005.

He narrated the Discover science series on the Disney Channel from 1992 until 1994. Campanella voiced the character of Dr. Curt Connors/The Lizard on Spider-Man: The Animated Series (1994–1997).

Campanella was nominated for a Daytime and Primetime Emmy Award and a Tony Award throughout his career.

Early life
Campanella was born in Manhattan, New York City to Sicilian immigrants Philip and Mary O. Campanella. His father was a pianist and his mother was a homemaker and dressmaker. He was the younger brother of actor Frank Campanella (1919–2006) and had another brother named Philip. The family lived in the Washington Heights neighborhood of Manhattan. He and his brothers grew up speaking Italian before learning English. The Campanella family was staunchly Catholic.

Campanella served in the United States Navy during World War II as a landing craft commander. At 18, he was one of the youngest commanders in the Navy, serving from 1944 to 1946. He later graduated from Manhattan College in 1948, and attended Columbia University, where he studied drama. Before starting his acting career, he worked as a radio sportscaster in Lewistown, Pennsylvania.

Career
Campanella appeared in such television shows as Combat!, Decoy, The Eleventh Hour, The Doctors, The Fugitive, Mission: Impossible,  Marcus Welby, M.D., Gunsmoke, The Big Valley, Alias Smith and Jones, A Man Called Ironside (pilot), The Untouchables,  Police Story, The Road West, The Invaders, The Mary Tyler Moore Show, Rockford Files, The Golden Girls, Mama's Family , Lois & Clark And Baywatch.

Campanella had a recurring role from 1959 to 1962 as a criminal named Joe Turino on the long-running CBS daytime drama Guiding Light. He had a recurring role as Dr. Ted Steffen on the medical drama The Doctors and the Nurses from 1964 to 1965. One of his most popular roles was as Lew Wickersham in season 1 (1967–1968) of the television series Mannix, serving as the head of the detective agency Joe Mannix (Mike Connors) worked for. He was let go from his role after the first season due to a reworking of the program's concept. He appeared as attorney Brian Darrell from 1969 to 1972 in The Bold Ones: The Lawyers. In 1973, he played an old flame of Mary Richards (Mary Tyler Moore) on The Mary Tyler Moore Show, the twenty-second episode of season 3, titled "Remembrance of Things Past". He played Los Angeles County Sheriff's Department Captain Monty Ballard in the crime drama TV movie Sky Hei$t in 1975.

Campanella played Ann Romano's (Bonnie Franklin) ex-husband, Ed Cooper, in eight episodes of One Day at a Time (1975–1984) and Barbara Stanwyck's love interest in the first season (1985–1986) of Aaron Spelling's short-lived Dynasty spinoff, The Colbys. He appeared in a second-season episode of The Golden Girls as a detective. He had a prominent role as Harper Deveraux on the soap opera Days of Our Lives from 1987 to 1988, had a recurring role as a doctor in Beauty and the Beast (1989–1990), a recurring role as Jimmy Everett on General Hospital from 1991 to 1992, and a recurring role on The Bold and the Beautiful from 1996 to 2005.

Campanella hosted the Canadian educational program Science International between 1976 and 1979, which aired on Nickelodeon as What Will They Think Of Next? He also appeared in the independent comedy, For Heaven's Sake.

On Broadway, Campanella was featured in three productions during the 1960s. His first, The Captains and the Kings, opened in January 1962 and lasted only seven performances. In February 1962, he was cast in A Gift of Time with film stars Henry Fonda and Olivia de Havilland. It was written and directed by Garson Kanin, and he received a Tony nomination as Best Featured Actor in a Play. His last Broadway performance was in the musical Hot Spot in 1963, which starred Judy Holliday. The show was not well received and delayed its opening four times, resulting in a run of 58 previews and 43 regular performances.

For a time Campanella provided the voice-over for BMW commercials in the United States, intoning, "BMW — the ultimate driving machine". For several years beginning in the 1970s, He was a spokesman for NAPA Auto Parts.

Campanella voiced the character of Dr. Curt Connors/The Lizard on Spider-Man: The Animated Series (1994–1997). He narrated the Discover science series on the Disney Channel from 1992 to 1994. His final film roles were that of Donald Meeks in For Heaven's Sake (2008) and in Lost Dream (2009) as Emil.

Throughout his career, Campanella was nominated for the Tony Award for Best Featured Actor in a Play for his work in A Gift of Time in 1962. In 1968, he was nominated for the Primetime Emmy Award for Outstanding Supporting Actor in a Drama Series for his role as Wickersham in Mannix. In 1989, Campanella was nominated for the Daytime Emmy Award for Outstanding Supporting Actor in a Drama Series for his role as Deveraux in Days of Our Lives.

Personal life and death
Campanella met his wife, Kathryn Jill Bartholomew, a singer and dancer, in 1963 while he was playing the leading man in Hot Spot'' on Broadway. They married on May 30, 1964, and had seven sons: Philip (b. 1965), Robert Yale (b. 1966), Joseph Anthony Jr. (b. 1967), Dominic Peter (b. 1969), Anthony F. (b. 1974), John Mario (b. 1977), and Andrew Michael (b. 1979).

Campanella died at the age of 93 on May 16, 2018, at his home in Sherman Oaks, California of complications from Parkinson's disease.

Filmography

Film

Television

References

External links

 
 

1924 births
2018 deaths
20th-century American male actors
21st-century American male actors
American male film actors
American male voice actors
American male soap opera actors
American male television actors
United States Navy personnel of World War II
American people of Italian descent
Catholics from New York (state)
Columbia University alumni
Deaths from Parkinson's disease
Male actors from New York City
Manhattan College alumni
Military personnel from New York City